Willian da Silva Dias (born 10 May 1994) is a Brazilian footballer who plays for FK Iskra Danilovgrad as an attacking midfielder.

Club career
Born in Porto Ferreira, Dias graduated from the youth academy of local São Carlos Futebol Clube. In 2011, at the age of 17, he made his professional debut for the club in Paulista A2. He scored six goals for the reserve team in the 2014 Campeonato Paulista under-20 championship. After having scored three goals in the 2016 season, he joined Grêmio Prudente on a loan deal on 1 July. On 25 September, he scored his first goal for the club in a 2–1 defeat against Taboão da Serra. In September, he returned to his parent club and was included in the Copa Paulista squad. He switched to Paulista Futebol Clube in January 2017.

Dias switched clubs and countries and moved to Portuguese second tier club F.C. Famalicão on 28 June 2017. On 6 August, he scored his first goal for the club in a 2–0 victory over F.C. Arouca.

On 27 January 2019, Dias joined F.C. Arouca.

Career statistics

Style of play
Dias not only has an attacking role in the team, he can also mark the opposition players.

References

External links

1994 births
Living people
Association football midfielders
Brazilian footballers
São Carlos Futebol Clube players
Paulista Futebol Clube players
F.C. Famalicão players
F.C. Arouca players
Varzim S.C. players
Liga Portugal 2 players
Brazilian expatriates in Portugal
Expatriate footballers in Portugal
People from Porto Ferreira